"Tomorrow Tonight" is a song co-written and recorded by American country music artist Craig Campbell.  It was released to radio on June 8, 2015, as the lead-off single to his upcoming third studio album, yet to be announced.  The song was written by Campbell, Justin Wilson, and Vicky McGehee.

Music video
The music video was directed by Chris Hicky and premiered in July 2015.

Chart performance

References

Craig Campbell (singer) songs
2015 songs
2015 singles
BBR Music Group singles
Songs written by Craig Campbell (singer)
Songs written by Vicky McGehee
Music videos directed by Chris Hicky